Exception (stylized as e∞ception) is a science fiction horror web anime series based on an original story by Hirotaka Adachi with character designs by Yoshitaka Amano, music by Ryuichi Sakamoto, and directed by Yūzō Satō.

The series debuted on Netflix on October 13, 2022.

Premise 
Humans are searching a new solar system for potential new planets to terraform after being forced to leave Earth. To explore a potential planet, "Womb", a 3D biological printer creates a exploration team one individual at a time to man spacecraft. However, a fatal exception causes one crew member, Lewis, to be misprinted as a deformed monster that could potentially pose a threat to the rest of the crew.  A new, successful printing of Lewis joins the crew to help in the situation, which raises philosophical questions of humanity, self, and life.

Characters 
Lewis

 Nina

 Mack

 Oscar

 Patty

Episodes 
All episodes were written by Hirotaka Adachi and directed by Yūzō Satō with Chien Yi Lin, Yu Cheng Wang, Mntn Chang and Grace Chen as assistant directors.

Production and release 
Netflix first announced the project as part of their Geeked Week in June 2021. Hirotaka Adachi wrote a new science fiction horror story, and the character designs were done by Yoshitaka Amano, who designs the characters for Final Fantasy games. The series is directed by Yūzō Satō.  At the next year's Geeked Week, Netflix released the first look at some the series art and character designs. A trailer was released in September 2022, revealing that Ryuichi Sakamoto composed the music for the series as well as the main Japanese and English cast members.

The series debuted worldwide on October 13, 2022.

Accolades 
The episode "Misprint" from Exception was nominated for an Annie Award for Directing in an Animated Television/Broadcast Production in 2023.

References

External links 
 
 
 

2022 anime ONAs
English-language Netflix original programming
Anime with original screenplays
Television series set on fictional planets
Horror anime and manga
Science fiction anime and manga
Netflix original anime
Tatsunoko Production